1847 in philosophy

Events

Publications
 Søren Kierkegaard, Works of Love (1847) and Edifying Discourses in Diverse Spirits (1847)

Births
 August 20 - Bolesław Prus (died 1912)
 November 2 - Georges Sorel (died 1922)

Deaths

Philosophy
19th-century philosophy
Philosophy by year